The 1999 Western Athletic Conference men's basketball tournament was held March 2–6 at the Thomas & Mack Center at the University of Nevada, Las Vegas in Paradise, Nevada. This was the final tournament before the formation of the Mountain West Conference.

Top-seeded Utah defeated New Mexico in the championship game, 60–45, to clinch their third WAC men's tournament championship.

The Utes, in turn, received an automatic bid to the 1999 NCAA tournament. They were joined in the tournament by two other WAC members, New Mexico and Tulsa, who all earned at-large bids.

Format
No changes were made to the tournament format from the 1997 or 1998 tournaments. Teams were again seeded based on their position within either the Mountain or Pacific Division (top six teams only).

Bracket

References

WAC men's basketball tournament
Tournament
WAC men's basketball tournament
WAC men's basketball tournament